The 2018 European Busdriver Championship was the inaugural competition of a bus maneuvering challenge. It was organized by Berliner Verkehrsbetriebe and held on September 22, 2018, at their bus depot at Indira-Gandhi-Straße, Berlin, Germany. 21 teams, each composed of one male and one female participant, competed in an eight-discipline course with three bus types.

Competition 

 Using a 3-axle rear-axle-steered double-decker bus (a MAN, 2.55 m wide, 13.73 m long), driving forward in a narrow lane (3 m wide) with two "square bends".
 Continuing with the double-decker, driving through two narrowly-spaced barrels at an angle (30-35°). The driver gives vocal and visual commands to an umpire who will set the desired barrel gap. The potential points decrease the larger the gap becomes. Touching the barrels forfeits all these points.
 Using a 2-axle electric bus (a Solaris Urbino 12 Electric; 12 m long), a 15×15 meter box is to be entered forward, the bus is to be turned around (using as many moves as desired), and the box to be exited, also in forward.
 Continuing with the electric, a slalom consisting of a hard left, a hard right,
 hard left with a line up
 Continuing with the electric, to make the "perfect stop", that is, the middle door needs to line up with an arrow on the sidewalk. (Perfect match: 500 pts, decreasing in steps of 100 pts, with no points awarded at a 1 m offset.) The gap between the bus and sidewalk is also evaluated.
 Continuing with the electric, going through a speed trap at 15 km/h - without being able to check the odometer.
 Using a 2-axle diesel bus (a Mercedez-Benz Citaro), driving backward through a narrow lane (3 m wide) with two square bends, using mirrors only, no reverse camera.

The entire "lap" is timed. The obstacle course exists twice (one mirror of the other), so that drivers from two competing teams went head to head at once. 22 duels were therefore run.

Driver standings

External links 

 

Motorsport competitions in Germany
European Busdriver